Brandy Burre (born September 27, 1974) is an American actress, best known for her portrayal of Theresa D'Agostino on the HBO series The Wire.

Burre was born in Sandusky, Ohio. She earned her master's degree in acting at Ohio University, and has performed on the stage in addition to her work in film and television.

In 2014, documentary filmmaker Robert Greene collaborated with Burre to produce the critically acclaimed film Actress, a portrayal of her tumultuous return to acting after several years dedicated to building a family.

References

External links

1974 births
Living people
People from Sandusky, Ohio
Ohio University alumni
21st-century American actresses